Mahbubul Alam may refer to:

 Mahbubul Alam (cricketer) (born 1983), Bangladeshi cricketer
 Mahbubul Alam Anik (born 1996), Bangladeshi cricketer
 Mahbubul Alam (author) (1898–1981), Bangladeshi author
 Mahbubul Alam (journalist), Bangladeshi journalist
 Mahbubul Alam (politician), Bangladeshi politician